Traveling Light is the debut album by Courtney Jaye, and was released by Island Records on June 7, 2005. The album peaked at #22 on the Billboard Top Heatseekers on June 25, 2005.

The song "Can't Behave" was featured in the 2006 film Aquamarine.

Track listing
"Lose My Head" – 3:44  (Gala, Jaye)
"Can't Behave" – 3:34  (Gary Louris, Preven, Jaye)
"Permanent" – 3:55  (Cutler, Preven, Jaye)
"Mental" – 4:26  (Kristen Hall, Jaye)
"Time For Goodbye" – 4:17  (Hall, Jaye)
"Somersault" – 4:02  (Cutler, Preven, Jaye)
"Traveling Light" – 3:39  (Lewis, Petty, Jaye)
"Hanalei Road" – 4:14  (Lewis, Petty, Jaye)
"Can You Sleep" – 3:51  (Butch Walker, Jaye)
"Love Song (For Everyone)" – 4:24  (Lewis, Petty, Jaye)
"This Is The Day" – 4:52  (Nina Gordon, Jaye)
"Love Me" – 3:21  (Matthew Sweet, Jaye)

Critical reception

Tim Cain, from the Decatur, Illinois, paper Herald & Review, placed the album in his top 20 for 2005. The Deseret News was less positive, hailing the "decent hooks and memorable lyrics" of some songs, but criticizing the album as a whole: "Traveling Light is an appropriate title for Courtney Jaye's debut album. It's like light ice cream--good in theory but lacking the rich and creamy taste you're expecting." Matt Blackett, in Guitar Player, praises the album's "sweet, pop-inflected vocals and acoustic-driven tunes."

Personnel

Musicians
Courtney Jaye – vocals
Taj Mahal – vocals 
Jeff Russo – guitar
Rusty Anderson – guitar
Danny Weissfeld – acoustic guitar, electric guitar
Dan Petty – acoustic guitar
Doug Petty – ukulele, piano
Kris Wilkinson – viola
David Henry – cello
Gal Asher – Fender Rhodes piano, programming
Tim Lauer – Wurlitzer piano, harmonium, Hammond b-3 organ
Craig Young – bass
Jerry Marotta – drums
Josh Freese – drums
Paulinho Da Costa – percussion

Charts

References

2005 albums
Island Records albums